Mutoid may refer to:

 Mutoids, cybernetically-enhanced humans from sci-fi TV series Blake's 7.
 Mutoid Waste Company, London rave promoters of the 1980s.
 Mutoid Man, American rock band formed in 2012 in Brooklyn, New York.